Diana Buitron-Oliver (17 April 194629 April 2002) was an American classical archaeologist and curator, specializing in Greek vase painting.

Life 
Buitron-Oliver began her university studies at Smith College in Northampton, Massachusetts under German-American art historian Dietrich von Bothmer at the Institute of Fine Arts at New York University. She completed her doctoral thesis in 1976 on the vase paintings of the Greek painter Douris (c. 500-460 BC).

Curator 
From 1977–1984, she succeeded Dorothy Kent Hill as curator at the Antiquities Department of the Walters Art Museum in Baltimore. Later she worked with two exhibitions at the National Gallery of Art in Washington D.C., "The Human Figure in Early Greek Art" (1987–88) and "The Greek Miracle. Classical Sculpture From the Dawn of Democracy, the Fifth Century, BC " (1992-1993). In 1992 she curated the exhibition "The Odyssey and Ancient Art" at Bard College in New York, together with Beth Cohen. From 1988 she was an adjunct professor teaching Greek art  at Georgetown University in Washington, D.C.

Researcher 
Buitron-Oliver was a frequent visitor to the American School of Classical Studies at Athens, Greece, taking her first trip there when  in 1972 when she was an NYU doctoral student. Her research focused on Greek vase painting and the archaeology of Cyprus. From 1978 to 1982 she led excavations in the sanctuary of Apollo Hylates in the ancient city of Kourion in Cyprus focusing on the archaic precinct, resulting in her 1996 publication, The Sanctuary of Apollo Hylates at Kourion: Excavations in the Archaic Precinct.

Her husband was Andrew (Drew) Oliver. In 1989, they built a home on Cyprus and returned there whenever possible to pursue research, focusing on the areas of Black Sea, the Near East, and other Mediterranean sites.

Buitron-Oliver died in Washington, D.C., 29 April 2002, at 56, after a long illness.

Selected works 

 Buitron-Oliver, Diana. Attic vase painting in New England collections. No. 7. Fogg Art Museum, Harvard University, 1972.
 Buitron-Oliver, Diana, ed. New perspectives in early Greek art. National Gallery of Art, 1991.
 Buitron-Oliver, Diana, ed. The Greek miracle: classical sculpture from the dawn of democracy: the fifth century BC. Abrams, 1992.
 Buitron-Oliver, Diana. Douris: a master-painter of athenian red-figure vases. Vol. 9. Philipp von Zabern, 1995.
 Buitron-Oliver, Diana, and Beth Cohen. "Between Skylla and Penelope: Female Characters of the Odyssey." The Distaff Side: Representing the Female in Homer's Odyssey (1995): 29.
 Buitron-Oliver, Diana. The Sanctuary of Apollo Hylates at Kourion: Excavations in the archaic precinct. Vol. 109. Paul Astroms Forlag, 1996.
 Buitron-Oliver, Diana, ed. The interpretation of architectural sculpture in Greece and Rome. National Gallery of Art, 1997.
 Buitron-Oliver, Diana. "Kourion: The evidence for the Kingdom from the 11th to the 6th century BC." Bulletin of the American Schools of Oriental Research 308.1 (1997): 27-36.
 Buitron-Oliver, Diana. Kourion: the elusive Argive settlement and its burial grounds from the 11th to the 8th century BC. Archaeological Research Unit, 1999.

References

External links 
 Ellen Herscher: Diana Buitron-Oliver: Art Historian, Archaeologist, CAARI Trustee, and CAARI News Editor. In: Cyprus American Archaeological Research Center News 23–24, 2001–2002, p. 4 online

1946 births
2002 deaths
American women academics
American women historians
American women archaeologists
20th-century American archaeologists
20th-century American women
American women curators
American curators